The 2006 Denmark Open in badminton was held in Aarhus, Denmark, from October 31 to November 5, 2006.

The prize money was US$170,000.

Venue
Aarhus Atletion, The Arena

Results

Men's singles

Others

External links
2006 Denmark Open
2006 Results 

Denmark Open
Denmark Open
Denmark Open